The Regionalliga Südwest was the second-highest level of the German football league system in the southwest of West Germany from 1963 until the formation of the 2. Bundesliga in 1974. It covered the states of Saarland and Rheinland-Pfalz.

Overview
Along with the Regionalliga Südwest went another four Regionalligas, these five formed the second tier of German football until 1974:

Regionalliga Nord, covering the states of Niedersachsen, Schleswig-Holstein, Bremen and Hamburg
Regionalliga West, covering the state of Nordrhein-Westfalen
Regionalliga Berlin, covering West-Berlin
Regionalliga Süd, covering the states of Bayern, Hessen and Baden-Württemberg

The new Regionalligas were formed along the borders of the old post-World War II Oberligas, not after a balanced regional system. Therefore the Oberligas Berlin and West covered small but populous areas while Nord and Süd covered large areas. Südwest was something of an anachronism, neither large nor populous. It was basically a remainder of the former French occupation zone.

Originally only the winners, later also runners-up of this league were admitted to the promotion play-off to the new Bundesliga, which was staged in two groups of originally four, later five teams each with the winner of each group going up.

The bottom three teams were relegated to the Amateurligas. Below the Regionalliga Südwest were the following Amateurligas:

Amateurliga Saarland
Amateurliga Rheinland
Amateurliga Südwest

The FSV Mainz 05, VfR Wormatia Worms, FK Pirmasens, SV Röchling Völklingen, Südwest Ludwigshafen and TuS Neuendorf all played every one of the eleven seasons of the Regionalliga Südwest.

Disbanding of the Regionalliga Südwest 

The league was dissolved in 1974. According to their performance of the last couple of seasons, seven clubs of the Regionalliga went to the new 2. Bundesliga Süd. The nine remaining clubs were relegated to the Amateurligas.

The teams admitted to the 2. Bundesliga Süd were:

Borussia Neunkirchen
1. FC Saarbrücken
FC Homburg
SV Röchling Völklingen
FSV Mainz 05
VfR Wormatia Worms
FK Pirmasens

Relegated clubs:

to the Amateurliga Saarland: VfB Theley, FC Ensdorf
to the Amateurliga Rheinland: TuS Neuendorf, Eisbachtaler Sportfreunde
to the Amateurliga Südwest: ASV Landau, Eintracht Kreuznach, SV Alsenborn, Südwest Ludwigshafen, FV Speyer

Qualifying to the 2. Bundesliga
From the Regionalliga Südwest, seven clubs qualified for the new 2. Bundesliga Süd, together with 13 teams from the Süd region.

The qualifying modus saw the last five seasons counted, whereby the last placed team in each season received one point, the second-last two points and so on. For a Bundesliga season within this five-year period, a club received 25 points, for an Amateurliga season none.

For the seasons 1969–70 and 1970–71, the received points counted single, for the 1971–72 and 1972–73 season double and for the 1973–74 season three times.

To be considered in the points table for the new league, a club had to play either in the Regionalliga Südwest in 1973-74 or to have been relegated from the Bundesliga to it for the next season, something which did not apply to the league that year.

The bottom three clubs in the league, nominally the relegated teams in a normal season, were barred from entry to the 2. Bundesliga, regardless of where they stood in the points ranking.

Points table:

 Source: DSFS Liga-Chronik , page: C4, accessed: 18 March 2009
 Bold teams are promoted to the 2nd Bundesliga.
 1 SV Alsenborn was denied the 2nd Bundesliga licence.

Re-creation of the Regionalliga

In 1994, the Regionalligas were reintroduced, this time as the third tier of German Football. The teams from the southwest were however integrated into the new Regionalliga West/Südwest with the clubs from Nordrhein-Westfalen. In 2000, when the number of Regionalligas was reduced from four to two, the south western clubs moved to the Regionalliga Süd. In 2008, with the introduction of the 3. Liga the southwestern clubs will again move, into the new Regionalliga West and again be with the teams from Nordrhein-Westfalen.

Winners and runners-up of the Regionalliga Südwest
The winners and runners-up of the league were:

 Bold denotes team went on to gain promotion to the Bundesliga.
The Borussia Neunkirchen holds the record for league wins in any of the five Regionalligas, having won Südwest five times.
The 1. FC Saarbrücken is the only southwest team to have won the old (1965) and new (1996) Regionalliga.

Placings in the Regionalliga Südwest 1963 to 1974 
The league placings from 1963 to 1974:

Source:

Key

Notes
1 TuRa Ludwigshafen merged with Phönix Ludwigshafen in 1964 to form Südwest Ludwigshafen.

Records
The league records:

All-time table
The best and worst teams in the all-time table of the league from 1963 to 1974:

References

Sources
 Deutschlands Fußball in Zahlen,  An annual publication with tables and results from the Bundesliga to Verbandsliga/Landesliga, publisher: DSFS
 kicker Almanach,  The yearbook on German football from Bundesliga to Oberliga, since 1937, published by the Kicker Sports Magazine
 Süddeutschlands Fussballgeschichte in Tabellenform 1897-1988  History of Southern German football in tables, publisher & author: Ludolf Hyll
 Die Deutsche Liga-Chronik 1945-2005  History of German football from 1945 to 2005 in tables, publisher: DSFS, published: 2006

External links
  Das deutsche Fussball Archiv 
 Regionalligas at Fussballdaten.de 

Defunct association football leagues in Germany
Sudwest
Football competitions in Rhineland-Palatinate
Football competitions in Saarland
1963 establishments in West Germany
1974 disestablishments in West Germany
Sports leagues established in 1963
Ger
Sports leagues disestablished in 1974